Sir Sacheverell Reresby Sitwell, 6th Baronet,  (15 November 1897 – 1 October 1988) was an English writer, best known as an art critic, music critic (his books on Mozart, Liszt, and Domenico Scarlatti are still consulted), and writer on architecture, particularly the baroque. Dame Edith Sitwell and Sir Osbert Sitwell were his older siblings.

Sitwell produced some 50 volumes of poetry and some 50 works on art, music, architecture, and travel.

Life
Sacheverell Sitwell was the youngest child of Sir George Sitwell, 4th Baronet, of Renishaw Hall. His mother was the former Lady Ida Emily Augusta Denison, a daughter of the 1st Earl of Londesborough and a granddaughter of Henry Somerset, 7th Duke of Beaufort. She claimed a descent through female lines from the Plantagenets.

Born in Scarborough, North Yorkshire, he was brought up in Derbyshire and educated at Eton College and Balliol College, Oxford. In World War I he served from 1916 in the British Army, in the Grenadier Guards.

After the war he went to Balliol College in Oxford but did not complete a degree, and was heavily involved in Osbert and Edith's projects. On 12 October 1925 he married a Canadian daughter of a wealthy banker, Georgia Doble (1905–1980). They had two sons – Sir Sacheverell Reresby Sitwell, 7th Baronet (1927–2009) and Francis Trajan Sacheverell Sitwell (1935–2004). He was also a member of White's and St James's clubs.

Georgia Doble had difficulty adapting to married existence and missed the social life in London. Despite affairs on both sides, they remained deeply attached to each other until the end and never officially separated. The personal correspondence of Doble, preserved at the Harry Ransom Center at the University of Texas, include letters with David Stuart Horner and Frank Magro, Osbert Sitwell's partners, and friends like Lawrence Audrain, John Lehmann, Loelia Lindsay, René Massigli, Evelyn Waugh, and Mae West.

Sitwell was an early member of the New Party, a group established in 1931 by Oswald Mosley and containing former members of the major British political parties.

In his later life he withdrew from the publicity that attached to the Sitwells collectively, instead preferring to travel and concentrate on writing. He became the 6th baronet, inheriting the title when Osbert died in 1969. He was made a Companion of Honour in 1984. His main residence was Weston Hall, Northamptonshire, the family home and he served as High Sheriff of Northamptonshire for 1948.

He died aged 90 in October 1988, and is buried in the churchyard of Weedon Lois in Northamptonshire, next to his wife Georgia, who predeceased him, and near his sister Edith.

As his poetry was so severely criticised, particularly by those who disliked the Sitwells in general, and although Canons of Giant Art was a work of considerable impact, he refused to publish any of his poems for many years. In 1967 Derek Parker published a selection of his poems in the summer edition of Poetry Review, including his elegy for his beloved sister Edith. Among his most remarkable and original works are a series of lengthy autobiographical and art-based "fantasias" such as "For Want of the Golden City", "The Hunters and the Hunted" and "Dance of the Quick and the Dead" (1936). Constant Lambert set to music The Rio Grande, one of his poems, which was performed and broadcast in 1928.

Sitwell was the author of the book Poltergeists (1940). It reviewed poltergeist cases over the centuries. He concluded that many, though not all, cases could be explained by human trickery (conscious or unconscious) and hysteria.

Works

The People's Palace (1918; poems)
The Hundred and One Harlequins (1922; poems)
Southern Baroque Art: a Study of Painting, Architecture and Music in Italy and Spain of the 17th & 18th Centuries (1924)
The Thirteenth Caesar (1924; poems; contains The Rio Grande, the basis of Constant Lambert's The Rio Grande)
German Baroque Art (1927)
The Cyder Feast (1927; poems)
All at Sea: A Social Tragedy in Three Acts for First-Class Passengers Only (1927) with Osbert Sitwell
The Gothick North: A Study of Mediaeval Life, Art, and Thought (1929)
Dr. Donne and Gargantua (1930) poems
Spanish Baroque Art, with Buildings in Portugal, Mexico, and Other Colonies (1931)
Mozart (1932)
Canons of Giant Art: Twenty Torsos in Heroic Landscapes (1933), containing "Agamemnon's Tomb"
Liszt (1934)
Conversation Pieces: a Survey of English Domestic Portraits and their Painters (1936)
Dance of the Quick and the Dead (1936)
Selected Poems (1936)
Narrative Pictures: a Survey of English Genre and its Painters (1938)
German Baroque Sculpture (1938)
Roumanian Journey (1938)
The Romantic Ballet (1938; with C. W. Beaumont) 
Old Fashioned Flowers (1939)
Poltergeists: An Introduction and Examination Followed By Chosen Instances (1940)
Valse des Fleurs (1941; new limited edition (400 copies, 20 of which signed and accompanied by a Henry Moore lithograph) published by The Fairfax Press in 1980; new edition published by Eland in 2008)
The Homing of the Winds: and other passages in prose. Faber & Faber, London (1942)
Primitive Scenes and Festivals Faber & Faber, London (1942)
Splendours and Miseries (1944)
British Architects & Craftsmen: survey taste, design, styles 1600-1830 (1945)
The Hunters and the Hunted (1948)
Selected Poems (1948)
The Netherlands; A Study of Some Aspects of Art, Costume and Social Life (1948, revised 1952)
Tropical Birds (1948)
Spain (1950)
Cupid and the Jacaranda (1952)
Fine Bird Books (1953) with Handasyde Buchanan and James Fisher
Truffle Hunt with Sacheverell Sitwell (1953)
Portugal and Madeira (1954)
Denmark (1956)
Arabesque & Honeycomb (1957)
Journey to the Ends of Time, etc. (1959)
The Bridge of the Brocade Sash: Travels and Observations in Japan (1959)
Golden Wall and Mirador: Travels and Observations in Peru (1961)
Great Houses of Europe (1964)
Monks, Nuns and Monasteries (1965)
Southern Baroque Revisited (1967)
Gothic Europe (1969)
A Background for Domenico Scarlatti, 1685-1757: Written for His Two Hundred and Fiftieth Anniversary (1970)
Tropicalia (1971; poems)
For Want of the Golden City (1973)
Battles of the Centaurs (1973)
Les Troyens (1973)
Look at Sowerby's English Mushrooms and Fungi (1974)
A Notebook on My New Poems (1974)
All Summer in a Day : An Autobiographical Fantasia (1976)
Placebo (1977)
An Indian Summer: 100 recent poems (1982; poems)
Hortus Sitwellianus (1984) with Meriel Edmunds and George Reresby Sitwell
Sacheverell Sitwell's England (1986) edited by Michael Raeburn

References

Sources

Sarah Bradford, Sacheverell Sitwell: Splendours and Miseries (1993) 
Sacheverell Sitwell: A Symposium (1975; ed. Derek Parker)
Thomas Balston, Sitwelliana 1915-1927 (1928) Thomas Balston
John Lehmann, A Nest of Tigers: The Sitwells in Their Times (1968)

External links
Sacheverell Sitwell Collection at the Harry Ransom Humanities Research Center (HRHRC)
Georgia Doble Sitwell Collection at the HRHRC
 
 
Sacheverell Sitwell on Faber and Faber

1897 births
1988 deaths
Alumni of Balliol College, Oxford
Baronets in the Baronetage of the United Kingdom
British Army personnel of World War I
Burials in Northamptonshire
English art critics
Grenadier Guards officers
High Sheriffs of Northamptonshire
Members of the Order of the Companions of Honour
Parapsychologists
People educated at Eton College
People from Scarborough, North Yorkshire
English male poets
20th-century English poets
English travel writers
Sacheverell
20th-century English male writers